Intelligentsia Coffee is an American coffee roasting company and retailer based in Chicago, Illinois. Founded in 1995 by Doug Zell and Emily Mange, Intelligentsia is considered a major representative of third wave coffee. In 2015, Peet's Coffee & Tea (itself part of JAB Holding Company) acquired a majority stake in the company.

History and locations

Aside from its headquarters at 1850 W. Fulton Street, Intelligentsia has several cafe retail locations throughout the Chicago area. They supply coffee to various Chicago-area cafes and restaurants, as well as other locations in the US and Canada.  They generally buy their beans directly from growers in Central America, South America, East Africa, and Ethiopia.  They currently operate four gas-powered Ideal Rapid Gothot Roasters at the Chicago Roasting Works. Two 90-kilo roasters and a 23-kilo reside in Chicago and a 40 kilo in Los Angeles. The machines date from the 1950s and were handcrafted from cast-iron and steel in Stuttgart, Germany.

On August 17, 2007, Intelligentsia opened its first store outside of Chicago at Sunset Junction in Silver Lake, a district east of Hollywood in Los Angeles, California. Intelligentsia has opened two additional stores in the Los Angeles area, in Venice and Pasadena. In 2013, Intelligentsia opened its first store in New York City inside The High Line Hotel. The second New York City location opened in June 2014, inside the Urban Outfitters store in Herald Square. This is the first location to offer a full food menu. They also have 2 stores in Boston and one in Austin, Texas.
A 2008 decision to stop serving 20-ounce coffee and espresso beverages in stores was met with controversy. Zell stated that the proportions are altered at such large quantities and certain drinks become watered-down, arguing that 20-ounce drinks end up "masking and adulterating the pure, intense flavors we work hard to source, roast and produce. We don't want this to just be a caffeine delivery device."

In 2009 Intelligentsia acquired Ecco Caffè of Santa Rosa, California, and has retained the brand.

In October 2015, it was announced that Peet's Coffee & Tea would buy a majority stake in Intelligentsia Coffee & Tea by the end of the year, as part of an expansion of Peet's into third wave coffee that also involved the acquisition of Stumptown Coffee Roasters. Intelligentsia was expected to continue operating independently, with founders Zell and Mange retaining a role in the company. The announcement came weeks after Intelligentsia had made known that it was seeking a private equity buy-out over $100 million.

In May 2022 employees working in Intelligentsia's Chicago locations and Roasting Works warehouse filed a petition for union representation. If successful they would hold a union election with an end goal of being represented by IBEW 1220, the same branch of IBEW that represents Colectivo Coffee Roasters.

Honors
In 2006, Intelligentsia was included on several local and national best-of lists.  One of their baristas also won national and international honors.

It has been winning local best of list recognition from 2000 to 2005.
In 2005, the local
recognition extended to national
recognition. In 2006, Intelligentsia was included on several local
and national "best" lists.

See also 

 Blue Bottle Coffee
 Counter Culture Coffee
 La Colombe Coffee Roasters
 Revelator Coffee
 Stumptown Coffee Roasters
 List of coffeehouse chains
 List of coffee companies
 Third wave of coffee

References

External links
 

Food and drink companies based in Chicago
Coffeehouses and cafés in the United States
Retail companies established in 1995
Restaurants established in 1995
Coffee brands
1995 establishments in Illinois
2015 mergers and acquisitions